Ahn Yang-ok (born 7 April 1957) is an educator and the 35th president of The Korean Federation of Teachers' Associations. Ahn is also a member of EIAP regional committee.

Education
He received B.A. degree in Physical Education from Seoul National University, followed by   M.A, and Ph.D. degrees in physical education from the same university. ,

Teaching

1981~1985
Teacher
 Secho Middle SchoolSeoul
 Donjak Middle School
 Sudo Girls’ High School

1988~1998
Instructor
 Seoul National University
 Dankook University
 Dong-duk Women’s University
 Yong-In University
 Korean National Sport University

2001~Present
Professor
 Seoul National University of Education

Career

 President, Directors’ Council of Students’ Affairs, Korean National Council for University of Education (2003~2005)
 Vice president, The Seoul Federation of Teachers’ Association (2005~2007)
 President, The Seoul Federation of Teachers’ Association (2007~2008)
 Chairperson, Sangmoon High School, Seoul, Republic of Korea (2008~2010)
 President, Korean Society of Sport Policy (2009~2011)
 Committee member, Education International Asia-Pacific Regional Committee (2013~Present)
 Commissioner, Council for Seoul Public Order (2010~Present)
 President, The Korean Federation of Teachers’ Association (2010~Present)

Awards
Presidential Awards of Korean Sports, Ministry of Culture, Sports and Tourism (October 14, 2011)
 Winner of the Physical Education Research Awards at the Korea Sports Awards
Mayor Awards of Culture for Seoul City, Seoul City Hall	(December 2, 2011)
 Winner of Seoul Culture Awards
Physical Education Research Awards, Korean Olympic Torch Association (December 7, 2010)
 Winner of Research Awards, Korean Olympic Torch Association
Excellence in Field of Physical Education Research, Korean Olympic Committee (February 9, 2010)
 Winner of awards for Excellence Research, Korean Olympic Committee

External links
Official website
Official English website
Official KFTA facebook page

Living people
1957 births
South Korean educators
Place of birth missing (living people)
Seoul National University alumni
Academic staff of Seoul National University